Houssem Eddine Souissi (born 20 October 1997) is a Tunisian football midfielder who currently plays for Hassania Agadir.

References

1997 births
Living people
Tunisian footballers
US Ben Guerdane players
AS Rejiche players
Association football midfielders
Tunisian Ligue Professionnelle 1 players
Hassania Agadir players
Qadsia SC players
Kuwait Premier League players
Tunisian expatriate footballers
Expatriate footballers in Kuwait
Tunisian expatriate sportspeople in Kuwait